The 1948 Ukrainian Cup was a football knockout competition conducting by the Football Federation of the Ukrainian SSR and was known as the Ukrainian Cup.

Competition schedule

First elimination round 
All games of the round took place on 3 October 1948, and replay next day on 4 October 1948.

 Notes: Dynamo Vinnytsia withdrew

Second elimination round 
All games of the round took place on 10 October 1948, and replay next day on 11 October 1948.

Quarterfinals 
All games were played in Kyiv.

Semifinals 
All games were played in Kyiv.

Final

Top goalscorers

See also 
 Soviet Cup
 Ukrainian Cup

Notes

References

External links 
 Information source 

1948
Cup
1948 domestic association football cups